The Protocol bringing under International Control Drugs Outside of the Scope of the 1931 Convention for Limiting the Manufacture and Regulating the Distribution of Narcotic Drugs, signed in 1948, was a drug control treaty designed to eliminate some of the loopholes associate with its predecessor treaty, the 1931 Convention for Limiting the Manufacture and Regulating the Distribution of Narcotic Drugs. It is perhaps most noteworthy as the first drug control treaty to implement the similarity concept; that is, its provisions applied to all drugs with similar harmful effects and abuse liabilities as the drugs specified in article I, paragraph 2 of the 1931 treaty  . The similarity concept was also included in the 1961 Single Convention on Narcotic Drugs and the 1971 Convention on Psychotropic Substances.

The impetus for the treaty was the popularity of new, uncontrolled opiate derivatives that were outside the scope of the Permanent Central Board's restrictions. In particular, manufacturers were switching from morphine to pethidine, methadone, and other designer drugs to evade the international restrictions. The similarity concept was specifically designed to combat these tactics.

In addition, every Party to the Protocol was committed to inform the UN Secretary-General of any drug used or capable of being used for medical or scientific purposes (and not falling within the scope of the 1931 Convention) which that party considered capable of abuse and of producing harmful effects. The Protocol also authorized the Commission on Narcotic Drugs to place such a drug under provisional control. The provisional control measures might be altered in the light of the conclusions and decisions of the World Health Organization (and subsequently in the light of experience).

The Protocol was superseded by the 1961 Single Convention on Narcotic Drugs.

References
Bayer, I. and Ghodse, H.: Evolution of International Drug Control, 1945–1995 , United Nations Office on Drugs and Crime.

External links
 
 

Drug control treaties
Treaties concluded in 1948
Treaties entered into force in 1949
1948 in France
Treaties of Afghanistan
Treaties of the People's Socialist Republic of Albania
Treaties of Australia
Treaties of Austria
Treaties of the Bahamas
Treaties of the Byelorussian Soviet Socialist Republic
Treaties of Belgium
Treaties of the Republic of Dahomey
Treaties of the Second Brazilian Republic
Treaties of Burkina Faso
Treaties of Cameroon
Treaties of Canada
Treaties of the Central African Republic
Treaties of the Republic of China (1912–1949)
Treaties of the Republic of the Congo
Treaties of Ivory Coast
Treaties of Cuba
Treaties of the Czech Republic
Treaties of Czechoslovakia
Treaties of the Republic of the Congo (Léopoldville)
Treaties of Denmark
Treaties of the Dominican Republic
Treaties of Ecuador
Treaties of the Kingdom of Egypt
Treaties of El Salvador
Treaties of the Ethiopian Empire
Treaties of Fiji
Treaties of Finland
Treaties of the French Fourth Republic
Treaties of West Germany
Treaties of Ghana
Treaties of the Kingdom of Greece
Treaties of the Hungarian People's Republic
Treaties of India
Treaties of Indonesia
Treaties of the Kingdom of Iraq
Treaties of Ireland
Treaties of Israel
Treaties of Italy
Treaties of Jamaica
Treaties of Japan
Treaties of Jordan
Treaties of the Kingdom of Afghanistan
Treaties of the Kingdom of Laos
Treaties of Lebanon
Treaties of Lesotho
Treaties of Liechtenstein
Treaties of Luxembourg
Treaties of Malawi
Treaties of the Federation of Malaya
Treaties of Mauritius
Treaties of Mexico
Treaties of Monaco
Treaties of Montenegro
Treaties of Morocco
Treaties of Myanmar
Treaties of the Netherlands
Treaties of New Zealand
Treaties of Nicaragua
Treaties of Niger
Treaties of Nigeria
Treaties of Norway
Treaties of the Dominion of Pakistan
Treaties of Papua New Guinea
Treaties of Paraguay
Treaties of the Philippines
Treaties of the Polish People's Republic
Treaties of the Socialist Republic of Romania
Treaties of the Soviet Union
Treaties of Rwanda
Treaties of Saudi Arabia
Treaties of Senegal
Treaties of Serbia and Montenegro
Treaties of Yugoslavia
Treaties of Sierra Leone
Treaties of Slovakia
Treaties of the Union of South Africa
Treaties of Francoist Spain
Treaties of the Dominion of Ceylon
Treaties of Sweden
Treaties of Switzerland
Treaties of Togo
Treaties of Tonga
Treaties of Trinidad and Tobago
Treaties of Turkey
Treaties of Uganda
Treaties of the Ukrainian Soviet Socialist Republic
Treaties of the United Kingdom
Treaties of Tanzania
Treaties of the Mutawakkilite Kingdom of Yemen
Treaties of Zambia
Treaties of Zimbabwe
Treaties extended to the Belgian Congo
Treaties extended to Ruanda-Urundi
Treaties extended to Greenland
Treaties extended to the Netherlands Antilles
Treaties extended to the Cook Islands
Treaties extended to Niue
Treaties extended to Tokelau
Treaties extended to Bermuda
Treaties extended to the Falkland Islands
Treaties extended to Gibraltar
Treaties extended to Saint Helena, Ascension and Tristan da Cunha
Treaties extended to Anguilla
Treaties extended to the British Virgin Islands
Treaties extended to Montserrat
Treaties extended to Wallis and Futuna
Treaties extended to Aruba
Treaties extended to Guadeloupe
Treaties extended to French Guiana
Treaties extended to Réunion
Treaties extended to Martinique
Treaties extended to French West Africa
Treaties extended to French Equatorial Africa
Treaties extended to French Somaliland
Treaties extended to French Madagascar
Treaties extended to French Comoros
Treaties extended to New Caledonia
Treaties extended to French Polynesia
Treaties extended to Saint Pierre and Miquelon
Treaties extended to the French Protectorate of Tunisia
Treaties extended to French Algeria
Treaties extended to French Morocco
Treaties extended to French Togoland
Treaties extended to French Cameroon
Treaties extended to the New Hebrides
Treaties extended to French Indochina
Treaties extended to French India
Treaties extended to the Nauru Trust Territory
Treaties extended to the Territory of New Guinea
Treaties extended to Christmas Island
Treaties extended to the Coral Sea Islands
Treaties extended to the Cocos (Keeling) Islands
Treaties extended to Heard Island and McDonald Islands
Treaties extended to Norfolk Island
Treaties extended to Ashmore and Cartier Islands
Treaties extended to the Trust Territory of Somalia
Treaties extended to Netherlands New Guinea
Treaties extended to Surinam (Dutch colony)
Treaties extended to the Western Samoa Trust Territory
Treaties extended to South West Africa
Treaties extended to American Samoa
Treaties extended to Baker Island
Treaties extended to Guam
Treaties extended to Howland Island
Treaties extended to Jarvis Island
Treaties extended to Johnston Atoll
Treaties extended to Midway Atoll
Treaties extended to Navassa Island
Treaties extended to the Trust Territory of the Pacific Islands
Treaties extended to Palmyra Atoll
Treaties extended to Puerto Rico
Treaties extended to the United States Virgin Islands
Treaties extended to Wake Island
Treaties extended to the Colony of Aden
Treaties extended to the Colony of the Bahamas
Treaties extended to the Colony of Barbados
Treaties extended to Basutoland
Treaties extended to the Bechuanaland Protectorate
Treaties extended to British Guiana
Treaties extended to British Honduras
Treaties extended to Brunei (protectorate)
Treaties extended to British Cyprus
Treaties extended to the Colony of Fiji
Treaties extended to the Gambia Colony and Protectorate
Treaties extended to the Gilbert and Ellice Islands
Treaties extended to the Gold Coast (British colony)
Treaties extended to the Colony of Jamaica
Treaties extended to British Kenya
Treaties extended to the British Leeward Islands
Treaties extended to the Crown Colony of Malta
Treaties extended to British Mauritius
Treaties extended to the Dominion of Newfoundland
Treaties extended to the Colony and Protectorate of Nigeria
Treaties extended to the Colony of North Borneo
Treaties extended to Northern Rhodesia
Treaties extended to Nyasaland
Treaties extended to the Colony of Sarawak
Treaties extended to the Crown Colony of Seychelles
Treaties extended to the Colony of Sierra Leone
Treaties extended to the Crown Colony of Singapore
Treaties extended to Tanganyika (territory)
Treaties extended to the Kingdom of Tonga (1900–1970)
Treaties extended to the Crown Colony of Trinidad and Tobago
Treaties extended to the Uganda Protectorate
Treaties extended to the British Windward Islands
Treaties extended to the Sultanate of Zanzibar
Treaties extended to British Dominica
Treaties extended to the Panama Canal Zone
Treaties extended to British Hong Kong
Treaties extended to the Aden Protectorate
Treaties extended to West Berlin